Mazaeras janeira is a moth of the family Erebidae. It was described by William Schaus in 1892. It is found in Brazilian states of Rio de Janeiro and Rio Grande do Sul.

References

 

Phaegopterina
Moths described in 1892